Lemos is a village on São Tomé Island in the nation of São Tomé and Príncipe. Its population is 1,136 (2012 census). It is 2 km east of Trindade.

References

Populated places in Mé-Zóchi District